Todt Hill is a  hill formed of serpentine rock on Staten Island, New York. It is the highest natural point in the five boroughs of New York City and the highest elevation on the entire Atlantic coastal plain from Florida to Cape Cod. The summit of the ridge is largely covered in woodlands as part of the Staten Island Greenbelt, although much of the surrounding area is developed and residential. It is considered one of the most exclusive and most expensive areas of Staten Island.

History
The name Todt comes from the German word "Tod" for "dead" and may refer to the cemetery (the present Moravian Cemetery, opened in 1740 and now the island's largest cemetery) on the southwestern foot of the ridge near the town of New Dorp that has been in use since colonial days. An alternate explanation is that the name was given by early Dutch settlers because of treeless rocky exposures on the hilltop, caused by the soil of the Staten Island Serpentinite locality.

At the beginning of the 20th century, many houses designed by the architect Ernest Flagg were built in the area. A significant part of Todt Hill is now included in the Staten Island Greenbelt.

Geography
The term Todt Hill is now often used to include the upscale developments in the hills along the eastern side of the ridge, which most island geographers classify as part of the neighborhood of Dongan Hills.

Two small, natural ponds are found on Todt Hill, and a Roman Catholic priory is located near the summit.  Staten Island Academy, a private school, moved its campus to Todt Hill in the 1960s.  There is a golf course adjoining the Moravian Cemetery, each of which has a man-made pond.  Otherwise the hill is either parkland or private homes.  There is no public transit available on Todt Hill, and most of the streets, including Todt Hill Road, the neighborhood's main thoroughfare, lack sidewalks.

The point of highest elevation is the unmarked rise in the street level at the intersection of Dalemere Road and Chapin Avenue.

Demographics
Todt Hill consists of the two census tracts 177 and 181, although census tract 177 incorporates part of Emerson Hill. According to the 2010 census, the demographics of Todt Hill were 80% non Hispanic White, 1% Black, 11% Asian, and 1% Multiracial. Hispanics of any race made up 7% of the population. The median household income of the area is roughly $120,000. Todt Hill is one of Staten Island's most affluent areas.

As of 2011, the district houses about 11,000 inhabitants. The population density was approximately 1,400 people per square kilometer.

Notable residents
 The Gambino crime family boss Paul Castellano lived there, in a house noted for its intended resemblance to the White House. His family continued to live on Todt Hill after his death, but moved in 2000.
 Mob Wives reality television star Drita D’avanzo grew up in the Todt Hill Houses.
 Former New York Mets relief pitcher John Franco currently lives on the hill.
 The Corleone family compound from The Godfather was filmed on Todt Hill.
 Frank Matthews, a notorious drug kingpin in the 1970s, lived on Todt Hill.
 Frank Cali, acting boss of the Gambino crime family, was killed outside his home in Todt Hill on March 13, 2019.

Transportation
Todt Hill is served by multiple bus routes on Richmond Road, including the  local buses, and the  express bus.

References

 

Neighborhoods in Staten Island
Geography of Staten Island